Zartonk is an Armenian village in the Armavir province of Armenia.

Zartonk (in Armenian Զարթոնք or in Western Armenian Զարթօնք) may refer to:

Zartonk (daily), Lebanese-Armenian newspaper, organ of the Armenian Democratic Liberal Party in Lebanon
Zartonk (Istanbul daily), Turkish Armenian daily (1932-1933)
Zartonk (novel), Armenian novel by novelist Malkhas